UltraMon is a commercial application for Microsoft Windows users who use multiple displays. UltraMon is developed by Realtime Soft, a small software development company based in Bern, Switzerland.

UltraMon currently contains the following features:

 Two additional title bar buttons for managing windows among the monitors
 Customizable button location
 A taskbar on each additional monitor that displays tasks on that monitor
 Pre-defined application window placement
 Display profiles for multiple pre-defined display settings
 Spannable wallpaper option
 Different wallpapers for different monitors
 Advanced multiple-monitor screensaver management
 Display mirroring (Forces to software rendering)
 Overcome Windows' limit of 10 displays

UltraMon is distributed as trialware, requiring the user to purchase the software after a trial period (30 days).

UltraMon 3.3.0 is available with full Windows XP, Vista, 7, and 8 support.

See also 
 Multi-monitor

References 

Utilities for Windows
Display technology